Dhak Chair  is a village in Phagwara Tehsil in Kapurthala district of Punjab State, India. The village is administrated by a Sarpanch who is an elected representative of village as per the constitution of India and Panchayati raj (India).

Demography 
According to the report published by Census India in 2011, Dhak Chair has 9 houses with the total population of 59 persons of which 33 are male and 26 females. Literacy rate of Dhak Chair is 81.13%, higher than the state average of 75.84%.  The population of children in the age group 0–6 years is 6 which is 10.17% of the total population.  Child sex ratio is approximately 1000, higher than the state average of 846.

Population data

Nearby villages   
 Bhabiana
 Brahampur
 Chair 
 Dhak Malikpur
 Dhak Manak
 Domeli
 Malikpur 
 Manak
 Sahni
 Wahid

References

External links
  Villages in Kapurthala
 Kapurthala Villages List

Villages in Kapurthala district